The Love Is Coming is a 2016 South Korean television series starring Kim Ji-young, Lee Min-young, Go Se-won and Lee Hoon. It airs on SBS on Mondays to Fridays at 8:30 AM KST starting June 20, 2016.

Summary 
A single mother who was struggling with life finally realizes the true meaning of happiness as she discovers that it is the little things that make her happy.

Cast

Main cast 
 Kim Ji-young as Lee Eun-hee
 Lee Min-young as Na Sun-young
 Go Se-won as Na Min-soo
 Lee Hoon as Kim sang-ho / Geum Bang-seok
 Gong Da-Im as Lee Hae-in
 Shim Eun-jin as Shin Da-hee / Lee Chil-Chil
 Jang Dong-Jik as Oh Woo-joo

Supporting Cast 
 Park Geun-hyung as Na Dae-gi
 Kim Young-ran as Yang Bok-soon
 Min Chan-gi as Kim Jung-hoon
 Lee Young-yoo as Kim Ah-young
 Maeng Se-chang as Jang Han-sol
 Jeok Woo as Park Ri-na

References

External links 
 

Seoul Broadcasting System television dramas
2016 South Korean television series debuts
2016 South Korean television series endings
Korean-language television shows